The Volga Boatman (French: Les bateliers de la Volga) is a 1936 French drama film directed by Vladimir Strizhevsky and starring Pierre Blanchar, Véra Korène and Charles Vanel.

The film's sets were designed by the art directors Serge Piménoff and Pierre Schild.

Cast
 Pierre Blanchar as Le lieutenant Vadime Borzine 
 Véra Korène as Lydia Goreff 
 Charles Vanel as Le colonel Goreff 
 Valéry Inkijinoff as Kiro 
 Raymond Aimos as Broïnka 
 Léon Courtois
 Albert Duvaleix as Un batelier 
 Pierre Labry as Kouproff 
 Georges Marceau
 Jean Marconi as Le jeune officier 
 Georges Prieur as Le juge 
 Edouard Rousseau 
 Maurice Tillet as Un batelier

References

Bibliography 
 Parish, Robert. Film Actors Guide. Scarecrow Press, 1977.

External links 
 

1936 films
French thriller drama films
1930s thriller drama films
1930s French-language films
Films directed by Vladimir Strizhevsky
Films scored by Michel Michelet
French black-and-white films
1936 drama films
1930s French films